
NVC community CG1 (Festuca ovina - Carlina vulgaris grassland) is one of the calcicolous grassland communities in the British National Vegetation Classification system. It is one of three short-sward communities associated with heavy grazing, within the lowland calcicolous grassland group, and is regarded as the south-west coastal counterpart of "typical" chalk grassland (community CG2).

It is a comparatively localised community. There are six subcommunities.

Community composition

The following constant species are found in this community:
 Carline Thistle Carlina vulgaris
 Cock's-foot Dactylis glomerata
 Sheep's Fescue (Festuca ovina)
 Mouse-ear Hawkweed (Hieracium pilosella)
 Common Bird's-foot Trefoil (Lotus corniculatus)
 Ribwort Plantain (Plantago lanceolata)
 Salad Burnet (Sanguisorba minor)
 Wild Thyme (Thymus praecox)

The following rare species are also associated with the community:

 Bristol Rock-cress Arabis stricta
 Goldilocks Aster Aster linosyris
 Small Hare's-ear Bupleurum baldense
 Dwarf Sedge Carex humilis
 Dwarf Mouse-ear Cerastium pumilum
 Yellow Whitlowgrass Draba aizoides
 Portland Spurge Euphorbia portlandica
 Early Gentian Gentianella anglica
 White Rock-rose Helianthemum apenninum
 Hoary Rock-rose Helianthemum canum
 the hybrid between White and Hoary Rock-roses Helianthemum × sulfureum
 Spotted Cat's-ear Hypochoeris maculata
 Somerset Hair-grass Koeleria vallesiana
 Spring Cinquefoil Potentilla tabernaemontani
 Autumn Squill Scilla autumnalis
 Spring Squill Scilla verna
 Rock Stonecrop Sedum forsterianum
 Silver Ragwort Senecio cineraria
 Spiked Speedwell Veronica spicata
 Curving Feather-moss Scorpiurium circinatum
 Neat Crisp-moss Tortella nitida

Distribution

This community is found in scattered locations on limestone sites around the south and west coasts of Britain.

Subcommunities

There are six subcommunities:
 the Carex humilis subcommunity
 the Scilla autumnalis - Euphorbia portlandica subcommunity
 the Trinia glauca subcommunity
 the Helianthemum canum subcommunity
 the Koeleria macrantha subcommunity
 the Festuca rubra - Scilla verna subcommunity

References

 Rodwell, J. S. (1992) British Plant Communities Volume 3 - Grasslands and montane communities  (hardback),  (paperback)

CG01
Vulgaris, NVC
Ovina, NVC